Club Bàsquet Pla de Na Tesa, also known as Opentach Bàsquet Pla by sponsorship reasons, is a basketball team based in Marratxí, Balearic Islands (Spain). The team currently plays in league LEB Plata.

History
In May 2014, CB Pla promoted to LEB Plata after winning the final round of Morón de la Frontera.

Season by season

References

External links
Official website

Basketball teams in the Balearic Islands
Former LEB Plata teams
Former Liga EBA teams
Sport in Mallorca